"Sunshine on Leith" is a ballad by Scottish folk rock duo the Proclaimers. Released in 1988, it is the title-track and second single from their album Sunshine on Leith.

In popular culture 
"Sunshine on Leith" is played frequently at Easter Road Stadium by Edinburgh-based football team Hibernian F.C., of whom the band are supporters.

Reception

Critical reception 
Bill Wyman of the Chicago Reader commented that the song, which he thought to be "a cross between a hymn and an Eagles tune", "genuinely reaches," describing the track as a "'I'm in love and happy to ever have been born' tearjerker".

Accolades 
In June 2018, "Sunshine on Leith" was voted the UK's favourite football anthem as part of the "Football Anthems World Cup" by Steve Lamacq on BBC Radio 6.

The song featured on the BBC Radio 4 series Soul Music on 15 December 2020.

Allusions 
A 2018 interview by The Courier revealed that Craig Reid opined "Sunshine on Leith" to be the "best [song] he's ever written".

Charts

Certifications

References

1988 singles
1988 songs
Rock ballads
Song recordings produced by Pete Wingfield
Hibernian F.C.